Elections to Calderdale Metropolitan Borough Council took place on Thursday 5 May 2011.

There were 17 seats up for election, one third of the council. After the election the council continued to have no overall control and continue to be run by a coalition between the Labour Party and the Liberal Democrats.

During 2011 the Liberal Democrat councillor for the Warley Ward Robert Pearson left the Liberal Democrats and spent the remainder of his time on the council as an Independent Liberal Democrat. Councillor Tom Bates of the BNP left the party and continued his term as an independent councillor.

Election result

Council Composition
Prior to the election the composition of the council was:

After the election the composition of the council was:

Ward results

Brighouse ward

The incumbent was Joyce Cawthra as an Independent. She had been elected as a Conservative.

Calder ward

The incumbent was David O'Neill for the Liberal Democrats.

Elland ward

The incumbent was Diane Park, an Independent. She had been elected as a Liberal Democrat.

Greetland and Stainland ward

The incumbent was Peter Wardhaugh for the Liberal Democrats.

Hipperholme and Lightcliffe ward

The incumbent was David Kirton for the Conservative Party.

Illingworth and Mixenden ward

The incumbent was Barry Collins for the Labour Party.

Luddendenfoot ward

The incumbent was Richard Marshall for the Conservative Party.

Northowram and Shelf ward

The incumbent was Roger Taylor for the Conservative Party.

Ovenden ward

The incumbent was Bryan Smith for the Labour Party.

Park ward

The incumbent was Arshad Mahmood for the Labour Party.

Rastrick ward

The incumbent was Craig Whittaker for the Conservative Party.

Ryburn ward

The incumbent was Robert Thornber for the Conservative Party.

Skircoat ward

The incumbent was Stephen Gow for the Liberal Democrats.

Sowerby Bridge ward

The incumbent was Andrew Feather for the Conservative Party.

Todmorden ward

The incumbent was Olwen Jennings for the Liberal Democrats.

Town ward

The incumbent was Timothy Swift for the Labour Party.

Warley ward

The incumbent was Jennifer Pearson for the Liberal Democrats.

References

2011 English local elections
2011
2010s in West Yorkshire